In Store Jam is the second compilation album released by British funk/acid jazz band Jamiroquai. Released as a promotional album in 1997, the record features a selection of tracks from all three of the group's early studio albums, as well as an additional live recording of Kool & the Gang's "Hollywood Swinging". All of the tracks from the album have, or been considered to become, singles. The album was only released in the United States. Two versions of the release were available: a standard CD, and a cassette tape release, retitled Sampler, with the addition of an extra track.

Track listing

References

1997 compilation albums
Jamiroquai compilation albums
Promotional albums